The Dolph Briscoe Unit (DB) or Briscoe Unit is a Texas state prison located near the town of Dilley in Frio County, Texas.

The unit opened in January 1992 and is named for former Texas Governor Dolph Briscoe.

As of August 31, 2013 Briscoe Unit employs 233 people of which 165 are security related employees, 42 non security and 14 are employees of the Windham School District

Offenders in the unit may have access to literacy education, as well as adult education and GED courses through the Windham School District programs, as well as English as a second language, special education and pre-release courses.
The unit also runs career and technology programs for inmates including: construction carpentry, electrical trades, landscape design, construction and maintenance.  Offenders may also have the opportunity of working with local community works projects such as with the local food bank, Habitat for Humanity and other local organizations.

The unit also runs agricultural operations including maintenance of security animals (horses and dogs) and edible crops.

In July 2021 the facility was cleared of domestic convicts and it is being rededicated to the incarceration of criminal border entrants under an order by Governor Abbott's Operation Lone Star.

References

External links
Unit Description at TDCJ

Prisons in Texas
Buildings and structures in Frio County, Texas
1992 establishments in Texas